Svenstrup & Vendelboe is an electro / dance / house producer team from Denmark, consisting of Kasper Svenstrup and Thomas Vendelboe.

Svenstrup and Vendelboe, produced music together for several years under various names. But in 2007 they decided to focus entirely on the commercial house scene under the name Svenstrup & Vendelboe. They became famous for the single "I Nat" with singer Karen. But their big breakthrough came with their remix of Medina's single "Kun for mig" winning two Danish DeeJay Awards in 2010 for their mix of the song. In 2011, they also released "Dybt vand" featuring Danish singer Nadia Malm on vocals. They have remixed hits by Robyn, Basim, Burhan G, Brinck, Emma, Medina, Outlandish and many others.

Discography

Albums

Singles 

Featured in

References

External links 
 Official website
 Discogs
 LastFM
 Spotify

Danish musical groups